Methodist-Episcopal Church of Marysville (also known as the ME Church of Marysville) is a historic Methodist church at 3rd Street in Marysville, Montana.

The Methodist church was built in 1887 during the local gold rush, and the church was abandoned in 1939.  John W. and Margaret C. Hollow of Helena bought the church in 1967 and restored it over the following years. The building was added to the National Register of Historic Places on January 5, 1984.

References

External links
Historical information

National Register of Historic Places in Lewis and Clark County, Montana
Churches completed in 1887
Methodist churches in Montana
Churches on the National Register of Historic Places in Montana
1887 establishments in Montana Territory